"Baby I Need Your Loving" is a 1964 hit single recorded by the Four Tops for the Motown label. Written and produced by Motown's main production team Holland–Dozier–Holland, the song was the group's first Motown single and their first pop Top 20 hit, making it to number 11 on the US Billboard Hot 100 and number four in Canada in the fall of 1964. It was also their first million-selling hit single. 

Cash Box described it as "an intriguing rock-a-cha-cha beat pleader...that [the Four Tops] carve out with solid sales authority."  Rolling Stone ranked the Four Tops' original version of the song at No. 400 on their list of the 500 Greatest Songs of All Time.

Personnel
 Lead vocals by Levi Stubbs.
 Background vocals by Renaldo "Obie" Benson, Lawrence Payton, Abdul "Duke" Fakir, and the Andantes: Jackie Hicks, Marlene Barrow, and Louvain Demps.
 Instrumentation by the Funk Brothers and the Detroit Symphony Orchestra (strings).
Piano by Earl Van Dyke
Bass by James Jamerson
Guitar by Robert White
Drums by Benny Benjamin
String arrangements by Gil Askey  
 Written by Brian Holland, Lamont Dozier, and Edward Holland Jr.
 Produced by Brian Holland and Lamont Dozier.

Johnny Rivers' version

"Baby I Need Your Lovin'" was covered in 1967 by Johnny Rivers, reaching No. 3 on Billboard Hot 100, topping the original version in chart performance. The song reached #1 in Canada.

As with Rivers' precedent single: the No. 1 hit "Poor Side of Town", his "Baby I Need Your Loving" was performed in an orchestral pop style, being arranged by Marty  Paich and featuring the LA Phil musicians who had performed on the Mamas and the Papas inaugural Top Ten hits. The second single from the track's parent album: Rewind, was also an orchestral pop version of a Motown classic, being Rivers' version of "The Tracks of My Tears".

Personnel  
 Lead vocals by Johnny Rivers.
 Background vocals by the Blossoms: Darlene Love, Fanita James, and Jean King.
 Instrumentation by the Wrecking Crew and the Los Angeles Philharmonic.
 Piano by Larry Knechtel
 Guitar by Mike Deasy
 Bass by Joe Osborn
 Drums by Hal Blaine
 String arrangements by Marty Paich
 Produced by Lou Adler
 Written by Brian Holland, Lamont Dozier, and Edward Holland Jr.

Cover versions
 The Fourmost released their version of this song, reaching No. 24 in the UK in November 1964.
 O. C. Smith covered it and took it to No. 52 in 1970 (and No. 21 US AC).
 Eric Carmen took "Baby I Need Your Loving" to No. 62 in 1979 (Change of Heart, 1978).  His cover also reached the Top 10 on the Canadian Adult Contemporary chart (#8), and No. 50 in the Top 100.
 Carl Carlton also covered the song in 1982 (The Bad C.C.), reaching No. 17 on the U.S. R&B charts, No. 12 in Australia in February 1983, and No. 27 in Canada.

References
Hits of the Sixties: The Million Sellers - By Demitri Coryton and Joseph Murrells, p. 100.

1964 songs
1964 singles
1967 singles
1970 singles
1979 singles
Four Tops songs
Songs written by Holland–Dozier–Holland
Johnny Rivers songs
Checkmates, Ltd. songs
Mitch Ryder songs
Eric Carmen songs
Song recordings produced by Brian Holland
Song recordings produced by Lamont Dozier
Motown singles
Imperial Records singles
RPM Top Singles number-one singles